Veazey is an unincorporated community in Greene County, in the U.S. state of Georgia.

History
A post office called Veazey was established in 1881, and remained in operation until 1933. The community was named after Eli A. Veazey, a local merchant and early postmaster. A variant name was "Veazy".

References

Unincorporated communities in Georgia (U.S. state)
Unincorporated communities in Greene County, Georgia